Amundsen Gulf is a gulf located mainly in the Inuvik Region, Northwest Territories, Canada with a small section in the Kitikmeot Region of Nunavut. It lies between Banks Island and Victoria Island and the mainland.

The Amundsen Gulf was explored by Norwegian explorer Roald Amundsen between 1903 and 1906. The gulf is at the western end of the famous Northwest Passage, a route from the Atlantic Ocean to the Pacific.

Few people live along the shores of the gulf, but there are a few towns and communities, including Sachs Harbour, Ulukhaktok, and Paulatuk. Heading north in the gulf one would find the Prince of Wales Strait. Heading southeast and east, the gulf leads through the Dolphin and Union Strait, past Simpson Bay and into the Coronation Gulf. From there one would go through the Dease Strait and into the Queen Maud Gulf, and eventually head northeast into the Victoria Strait. Heading west and northwest a traveller would first enter the Beaufort Sea and then the Arctic Ocean.
The entire gulf is in the Arctic tundra climate region, characterized by extremely cold winters. In late winter the Amundsen Gulf is covered in sea ice. Most of the ice breaks up in July during a normal year, with some areas in the far eastern and northern part of the gulf only breaking up in August.

Beluga whales, seals, Arctic char, cod, and even salmon use the waters of the gulf. Sockeye and pink salmon appeared for the first time in nearby waters between 1999 and 2001.

See also 
 De Salis Bay
 Storkerson Bay

References

External links 
 On the Edge of Ice in the Amundsen Gulf

Gulfs of the Northwest Territories
Gulfs of the Arctic Ocean
Canadian Arctic Archipelago
Geography of the Inuvialuit Settlement Region